Now 70s (formerly Channel U, Channel AKA, Massive R&B and Total Country) is a British free-to-air music television channel, owned by All Around the World Productions, available through Sky UK, Freeview and Virgin Media within the UK. It focuses on music from the 1970s, being the third decade-oriented channel in the Now portfolio, along with Now 80s and Now 90s.

History

Channel U

Channel U was a significant outlet not only for established artists, but also for those who are just starting out, helping the breakthrough for acts such as Tinchy Stryder, Tinie Tempah, Dizzee Rascal, Chip, Wretch 32, Devlin, Giggs, Skepta and N-Dubz. Its material "includes crude productions shot with handheld digital video cameras," and helps new musicians attract attention and build a fan base.  According to its website, "the aim of the channel was to highlight to the public, the raw and unsigned talent we have in the UK, and give them a platform from which they could perform," and it has been successful in this mission, as suggested by the production and popularity of such compilation CDs as Channel U: The Album.

Many artists have expressed their loyalty to the channel in their lyrics; for example, in Lady Sovereign's "9 to 5", "Channel who? Oh Channel U, the ones who made me huge, like Katie Price's boobs!". Other artists to comment on Channel U include Kano, Ironik, Lethal Bizzle, Sway, Remi Nicole, Mr Wong, and Dizzee Rascal. Dan le sac vs Scroobius Pip criticised Channel U in their song "Fixed", as did Lowkey, who cited the absence of any innovation and the channel's lack of desire to take risks.

Channel U commissioned the first 'grime comedy', an animated adult sitcom named The Booo Krooo. The TV series ran for six episodes and focused on the misadventures of three young MCs trying to break into the music game, but often ending up worse off than when they started. The Booo Krooo was originally a cult classic to readers of RWD Magazine and came got the attention of the Channel U after being co-signed by Missy Elliott. The animation series was developed by Matt Mason and Alex Donne Johnson with illustrations by Julian Johnson, aka Art Jaz. Music publication Ransom Note said: "Boo Kroo were essentially a proto version of People Just Do Nothing. After proving a popular feature in the magazine, Boo Kroo were given their own show on Channel U – which is how this video for the track (produced by Sticky) came about." In October 2005, the first annual Channel U Awards were held in London with live performances from its underground playlist.

Before he joined MTV to host the British version of Pimp My Ride, Tim Westwood had a show on Channel AKA, along with his other media activity. Following the success of the Westwood show the channel further developed its programming by licensing a lifestyle TV series, The Ballers Show, in 2006. The 30-minute show gave its audience the unique opportunity to see the real lives of footballers off the pitch and featured Premier League football stars including Jermain Defoe and Jermaine Pennant.

On 14 July 2016, the channel's founder, Darren Platt, died. In his obituary in The Guardian the newspaper stated that Channel U "forged a place for a genre that began its life ignored by the mainstream".

On 25 September 2020, it was confirmed that Channel U would be returning to TV on 13 November 2020 to promote the film Against All Odds. Due to technical issues, the return was postponed to 20 November 2020, and it aired for six hours on Clubland TV.

Channel AKA

The parent company of Fizz TV and Channel U went into voluntary liquidation at the beginning of February, 2009, before being purchased by Mushroom TV. When purchasing the two channels, Mushroom TV agreed that Channel U and Fizz TV should be rebranded. The two channels were rebranded as Channel AKA and Starz TV on 16 March 2009.

On 22 June 2012, Mushroom TV entered liquidation. Ofcom's television broadcast licensing update for May 2012, indicates that Channel AKA was sold to All Around the World Productions, who at the time owned Clubland TV and Massive R&B (now Now 90s) and had also acquired Greatest Hits TV under UltimateHits Limited. On 29 November 2012, the channel launched on Freesat but was removed on 15 April 2013. The channel returned to Freesat on 1 October 2015 alongside its sister channels Chilled TV, Clubland TV and Now Music, before being removed again on 12 May 2017.

Channel AKA and its predecessor Channel U have since been remembered for introducing the music careers of artists such as Dizzee Rascal, Kano, Wiley and Lethal Bizzle.

Massive R&B

On 1 June 2018, Channel AKA's slot was replaced with Massive R&B. (the second time an All Around the World owned network has used the name), now focusing on celebrating classic hip-hop & R&B from the 1990s and 2000s, and current urban music - from US rap to UK grime.

Total Country

On 1 November 2018, five months after Massive R&B relaunched, it was rebranded as a country music channel called Total Country, celebrating country music, old and new, from Dolly Parton and Garth Brooks to Carrie Underwood, Ward Thomas and The Shires.

The channel launched on Virgin Media on 8 March 2019, along with sister channel Now 90s. It was previously available via the red button on Clubland TV on the platform along with Now 80s and Now 90s until it was removed on 1 March 2018.

From 20 November 2019 until 27 December 2019, Now 80s used Total Country's slot since the slot that is normally used for Now 80s was used for Now Christmas, efficiently ceasing the channel's broadcast in the process.

Now 70s
On 27 December 2019, the channel was rebranded as Now 70s, becoming the third decade-oriented channel in the Now-branded portfolio.

On 26 February 2020, the channel launched on Freeview on channel 78, replacing Now 90s. It was removed from the platform on 26 May 2020, coinciding with Together increasing its broadcast hours, and returned on 8 July 2020 as an exclusive to Manchester on channel 78 and via Channelbox on channel 271 (connected TVs only). On 28 April 2021, it returned to Freeview outside Manchester on channel 76, replacing Now 80s, which became exclusive to Manchester.

As well as various chart shows (with former Radio 1 DJs like Mark Goodier and Bruno Brookes) and artist battles (such as Bowie vs Bolan, or ABBA vs Boney M.) based upon the music of the 1970s, the channel also features music from the 1960s in their Now 70s presents Now 60s programming block, in a similar fashion to how Now 80s had a 1970s programme block prior to the launch of Now 70s as a standalone channel.

On 23 February 2022, it was confirmed that Now 70s and the other three AATW channels would launch on Sky Glass in the future, although a specific launch date was not given.

On the 20th of September 2022, Now 70s closed on Freeview.

On 2 March 2023, Now 70s reappeared on Freeview as a FAST channel on Channelbox channel 271 alongside Now 80s and Now 90s.

Presenters
DJs hired in the 2020s to present shows for the channel and record voice-overs links include:
 Pat Sharp
 Simon Bates
 Mark Goodier 
 Tony Blackburn
 David Jensen
 Robin Banks

Criticisms
In June 2005, the channel was fined £18,000 by Ofcom for a number of offences, including the broadcasting of inappropriate material, using premium rate telephone services in programmes, and failing to ensure a clear distinction between programmes and advertisements.

Notes

References

External links
Background and history of Channel U

Music video networks in the United Kingdom
Black British music
Country music mass media
Television channels and stations established in 2003
2003 establishments in the United Kingdom